The 1983–84 Eredivisie season was the 24th season of the Eredivisie, the top level of ice hockey in the Netherlands. Six teams participated in the league, and the Nijmegen Tigers won the championship.

Regular season

Playoffs

Semifinals 
 Heerenveen Flyers - Eaters Geleen 2:0 on series
 Nijmegen Tigers - G.IJ.S. Groningen 2:0 on series
 Tilburg Trappers - Amstel Tijgers Amsterdam 2:1 on series

Final round

External links
Nederlandse IJshockey Bond

Neth
Eredivisie (ice hockey) seasons
Ere